Leon Sever (born 9 April 1998) is a Slovenian footballer who plays for Radomlje as a midfielder.

Career

Born in Brussels, Belgium, Sever started his career in Slovenia at the age of four with Izola. At the age of 13, he joined the youth academy of Italian side Triestina, but soon left after the club went bankrupt and returned to Izola. In the middle of the 2014–15 season, Sever transferred to Koper.

In 2017, he signed for Tabor Sežana in the Slovenian second division.

References

External links
 Leon Sever at Soccerway

1998 births
Living people
Footballers from Brussels
Slovenian footballers
Association football midfielders
Slovenian expatriate footballers
Slovenia youth international footballers
Slovenia under-21 international footballers
FC Koper players
NK Tabor Sežana players
Manisa FK footballers
NK Bravo players
NK Radomlje players
Slovenian expatriate sportspeople in Turkey
Expatriate footballers in Turkey
Slovenian PrvaLiga players
Slovenian Second League players